The 2021–22 Eredivisie Vrouwen was the twelfth season of the Netherlands women's professional football league. Twente started the season as defending champions. The season saw Feyenoord entering the league, meaning the league was expanded to include nine teams.

Format 
Four years after creating their women's program, Feyenoord joined the league, expanding the league to nine teams. Each team played all of the other teams three times and each round one team had a bye.

Teams

Standings

Results

Statistics

Top scorers

Hat-tricks(+)

References

External links 
 Official website
 Season on soccerway.com

Eredivisie (women) seasons
Netherlands
2021–22 in Dutch women's football